İbrahim Öztürk (born 21 June 1981) is a Turkish footballer who plays as a central defender for Altay.

Started his career at Kayseri Erciyesspor, located in his birth place Kayseri, Öztürk played in all professional leagues in governed by Turkish Football Federation and achieved at least promotion titles via play-off, or direct league titles. Probably as most notable honour of his career, Öztürk was a part of Süper Lig title holder Bursaspor in 2009–10 season.

Honours
Source:

Karamanspor
TFF Third League: 2003–04

Bursaspor
Süper Lig: 2009–10

Sivasspor
TFF First League: 2016–17

Altay
TFF Second League: 2017–18
TFF First League (Play-offs):  2020–21

References

External links
 
 

1981 births
Living people
Turkish footballers
Kayseri Erciyesspor footballers
Altay S.K. footballers
Bursaspor footballers
Sivasspor footballers
Süper Lig players
People from Kayseri
Association football defenders